Ngandzalé is a small town on the island of Anjouan in the Comoros. According to the 1991 census the village had a population of 4,252.

References

Populated places in Anjouan